The 1939 Kansas Jayhawks football team represented the University of Kansas in the Big Six Conference during the 1939 college football season. In their first season under head coach Gwinn Henry, the Jayhawks compiled a 2–6 record (1–4 against conference opponents), tied for fourth place in the conference, and were outscored by opponents by a combined total of 107 to 47. They played their home games at Memorial Stadium in Lawrence, Kansas.

The team's statistical leaders included Ed Hall with 189 rushing yards, Ralph Miller with 261 passing yards, Jake Fry with 137 receiving yards, and Fry and Milt Sullivant with 12 points scored each. Sullivant was the team captain.

Schedule

References

Kansas
Kansas Jayhawks football seasons
Kansas Jayhawks football